
Katherine Lanpher (born 1959) is an American writer, journalist, broadcaster, and podcaster, who came to national prominence as the co-host of the Air America Radio program The Al Franken Show in 2004 and 2005.

Early life and education
Katherine Lanpher was born in 1959.
Lanpher graduated with a degree in journalism from Northwestern University and with a master's degree in American Cultural History from the University of Chicago.

Career
Lanpher started her career with internships at the Muskegon Chronicle, the Detroit Free Press and the Chicago Sun-Times.  Lanpher worked for the St. Paul Pioneer Press for sixteen years (the last six as a columnist), then left to host Minnesota Public Radio's Midmorning program from August 1998 until January 20, 2004.

Lanpher moved to New York City in 2004 to co-host the Air America Radio flagship program The O'Franken Factor  She left the show on October 7, 2005 to write a memoir concerning her move to New York City, where she currently resides.  Her memoir is entitled Leap Days: Chronicles of a Midlife Move and was published on October 10, 2006 by Springboard Press.

On January 4, 2007, More magazine announced that Lanpher would host an hour-long weekly broadcast on XM Satellite Radio called More Time; it debuted January 16 on XM's "Take Five" channel. The announcement said the broadcast would "celebrate the lifestyles of 40+ women with coverage of real women, health, fashion, beauty, travel, entertainment and more. The show ended on or before XM's merger with Sirius Radio.

Since July 2008, Lanpher has been a contributor to WNYC's The Takeaway.

Podcasts
Since 2006, Lanpher has hosted the monthly "Upstairs at the Square" for Barnes & Noble, currently available as a podcast and since March 2008 as part of the Barnes & Noble Studio.  In 2009, Lanpher became the host of TIME Financial Toolkit, a Time magazine podcast in which she talks to "TIME business and economics reporters to sort through the headlines, forecasts, news and numbers."

References

External links 
 Katherine Lanpher's official website (no longer updated)

1959 births
Living people
American memoirists
Medill School of Journalism alumni
American radio personalities
Barnes & Noble
People from Moline, Illinois
Time (magazine) people
University of Chicago alumni
American women journalists
Journalists from Illinois
Chicago Sun-Times people
American women memoirists
21st-century American women